The 542d Aircraft Control and Warning Group is an inactive United States Air Force unit. It was last assigned to the 28th Air Division, stationed at Hamilton Air Force Base, California. It was inactivated on 6 February 1952.

This command and control organization was responsible for Aircraft Control and Warning (Radar) stations along the West Coast.  On 27 April 1950, the reserve 566th AC&WG was activated as a Corollary unit at Hamilton, sharing the 542d's equipment and facilities.  The 566th was called to active duty on 10 May 1951 and was inactivated, with its personnel used as fillers for the 542d.  It was dissolved after about three years, with the units being assigned directly to its parent Air Division.

Lineage

 Established as 542d Aircraft Control and Warning Group 
 Activated on 8 December 1949
 Inactivated on 6 February 1952
 Disbanded on 21 September 1984

Assignments
 28th Air Division, 8 December 1949 – 6 February 1952

Stations
  Hamilton AFB, California, 8 December 1949 – 6 February 1952

Components

 666th Aircraft Control and Warning Squadron
 Mount Tamalpais, California, 27 November 1950 – 6 February 1952
 667th Aircraft Control and Warning Squadron
 Hamilton AFB, California, 8 December 1949 – 6 February 1952
 668th Aircraft Control and Warning Squadron
 Mather AFB, California, 8 December 1949 – 6 February 1952
 669th Aircraft Control and Warning Squadron
 Fort MacArthur, California, 5 May 1950 – 27 November 1950
 670th Aircraft Control and Warning Squadron
 Camp Cooke, California, 5 May 1950 – 27 November 1950

 774th Aircraft Control and Warning Squadron
 Madera AFS, California, 27 November 1950 – 6 February 1952
 775th Aircraft Control and Warning Squadron
 Cambria AFS, California, 7 March 1951 – 6 February 1952
 776th Aircraft Control and Warning Squadron
 Point Arena AFS, California, 27 November 1950 – 6 February 1952
 777th Aircraft Control and Warning Squadron
 Klamath AFS, California, 18 December 1950 – 6 February 1952

See also
 List of United States Air Force aircraft control and warning squadrons

References

 
 Grant, C.L., The Development of Continental Air Defense to 1 September 1954, (1961), USAF Historical Study No. 126

External links

Aerospace Defense Command units
Air control groups of the United States Air Force